David Martin Luther Thomas (3 September 1897 - 26 June 1971) was a Welsh  Anglican priest, and the Archdeacon of Brecon from 1959 to 1969.

Thomas was educated at  St David's College, Lampeter. After curacies at Swansea, Knighton and Llansamlet he held incumbencies at Llangammarch then St Barnabas, Swansea from 1935. He was treasurer of Brecon Cathedral from 1958 to 1959.

References

Archdeacons of Gower
20th-century Welsh Anglican priests
Alumni of the University of Wales, Lampeter
20th-century Welsh people